Wu Han (died 44 CE), courtesy name Ziyan, was a Chinese military general and politician during the Eastern Han dynasty who made great contributions to Emperor Guangwu (Liu Xiu)'s reestablishment of the Han Dynasty and who is commonly regarded as Emperor Guangwu's best general, but who was also known for cruelty against civilians. He was also one of the 28 Generals of Yuntai (ranked no. 2, behind Deng Yu).

Life
Wu Han was initially a deputy to Peng Chong, the governor of Yuyang Commandery (漁陽, roughly modern Beijing), during the brief reign of Gengshi Emperor.  In 23, he was sent by Peng to assist Liu Xiu while Liu was still a general under Gengshi Emperor.  Liu was impressed by Wu's prowess on the battlefield, and he made Wu one of his key generals.  After Liu declared himself emperor in 25, he made Wu the commander of the armed forces (大司馬, da sima) – one of the three most important officials in the imperial government.  It is because Emperor Guangwu greatly elevated Wu, who was Peng's deputy, while ignoring Peng in his promotions, that partly led to Peng's eventual revolt against Emperor Guangwu in 26.

Wu was strong in military tactics but not in overall strategies, and he often became the implementer of Emperor Guangwu's own excellent strategies.  Wu was, to his credit, known for his hard work and lack of corruption.  He also was a major advocate against pardonsa fact later cited by the great Shu Han statesman Zhuge Liang in refusing to grant pardons.

A major fault of Wu was, as noted, he was cruel to civilians, and his soldiers were lacking in discipline with regard to pillaging civilians.  In 26, for example, as Wu Han led his forces through Nanyang Commandery (roughly modern Nanyang, Henan), his soldiers often pillaged from the people.  At that time, one of Emperor Guangwu's other generals, Deng Feng, who was from Nanyang Commandery, happened to be on vacation in the commandery.  He was so incensed by Wu's cruelty that he led the people in revolt.  A more salient example of Wu's cruelty, however, came in 36, when the Han forces, commanded by Wu, captured Chengdu, the capital of Gongsun Shu's separatist state Chengjia, to finally reunify the empire.  Chengdu surrendered after Gongsun died from battle wounds during the siege of Chengdu.  Two days later, Wu suddenly ordered that the Gongsun and Yan (the clan of Gongsun's general Yan Cen clans be slaughtered to the last child, and that his soldiers pillage the city of Chengdu and burn Gongsun's palace.  A large number of civilians were raped or killed during the pillage.  Other than an edict rebuking Wu and his deputy Liu Shang, Emperor Guangwu allowed Wu's actions to go unpunished.

For his accomplishments, Wu was created the Marquis of Guangping by Emperor Guangwu.  When Wu died in 44, Emperor Guangwu ordered that he be buried with the same honors given to the great Western Han statesman Huo Guang.

References

b

44 deaths
Year of birth unknown
Han dynasty generals from Henan
Han dynasty politicians from Henan
Politicians from Nanyang, Henan